UZU-MAKI is the 3rd album of singer Kotoko under Geneon Entertainment. It was released on December 13, 2006.

Track listing 
Introduction
Composition/Arrangement: Kazuya Takase, Tomoyuki Nakazawa
UZU-MAKI
Lyrics: Kotoko
Composition: Kazuya Takase
Arrangement: Kazuya Takase, Takeshi Ozaki

Lyrics/Composition: Kotoko
Arrangement: C.G mix

Lyrics/Composition: Kotoko
Arrangement: Kazuya Takase

Lyrics/Composition: Kotoko
Arrangement: Maiko Iuchi

Lyrics: Kotoko
Composition: Kazuya Takase
Arrangement: Tomoyuki Nakazawa

Lyrics/Composition: Kotoko
Arrangement: Tomoyuki Nakazawa, Takeshi Ozaki

Lyrics: Kotoko
Composition/Arrangement: C.G mix

Lyrics/Composition: Kotoko
Arrangement: Kazuya Takase

Lyrics/Composition: Kotoko
Arrangement: Maiko Iuchi
being
Composition/Lyrics: Kotoko
Arrangement: Kazuya Takase
Goodbye Dear
Lyrics/Composition: Kotoko
Arrangement: Tomoyuki Nakazawa, Takeshi Ozaki

Lyrics: Kotoko
Composition: Kazuya Takase
Arrangement: Kazuya Takase, Tomoyuki Nakazawa

2006 albums
Kotoko (singer) albums